"" ("Join together all Seychellois") is the national anthem of the Seychelles.

Background 
The anthem was created through a competition, after the adoption of the Constitution of the Republic of Seychelles, dated 21 June 1993. The constitution stated there was to be a national flag, a national anthem, a national emblem and a national motto. The constitution did not mention any anthems, since the anthem is prescribed by an Act.

The anthem was created by David André and Georges Payet, as an entry for the competition. According to Payet, the anthem was written in a single day.

During the creation of the anthem, they were approached, along with a third individual, Antoine Azemia, by the organising committee, who suggested they work together and come up with something new, as their initial submission each contained something they were looking for. Azemia decided to back out, the duo settled in an old house at La Plaine St André, where they worked in harmony, pasting bits and pieces, before coming up with the final result.

The arrangement for the anthem was made by Russian orchestra expert and band conductor Anatoli Savatinov.

"Koste Seselwa" was recorded for the first time by the French Republican Guard Band in Paris, where André had the chance to attend and witness the event.

The anthem was adopted as the national anthem of Seychelles on the National Day, at 18 June 1996.

Lyrics

See also
 "Fyer Seselwa"

Notes

References

External links
The anthem played in an official ceremony
Vocal
Instrumental

African anthems
Seychellois music
National symbols of Seychelles
National anthem compositions in E-flat major